Jan Klijnjan (26 February 1945 – 15 June 2022) was a Dutch professional footballer.

Career
He played as a midfielder or striker. He made 11 appearances scoring 2 goals for the Netherlands national team between 1967 and 1972.

References

External links
 
 
 
 International appearances

1945 births
2022 deaths
People from Papendrecht
Dutch footballers
Footballers from South Holland
Association football midfielders
Netherlands international footballers
Eredivisie players
Eerste Divisie players
Ligue 1 players
FC Dordrecht players
Sparta Rotterdam players
FC Sochaux-Montbéliard players
Dutch expatriate footballers
Dutch expatriate sportspeople in France
Expatriate footballers in France